Benjamin Norman "Murphy" Greenberg (June 30, 1907 – October 22, 1984) was an American football player. 

A native of New York City, Greenberg moved to Leonia, New Jersey at an early age. He competed in football, baseball track, baseball, and boxing as a teenager. He played college football as a halfback and fullback for Rutgers University from 1927 to 1929.  

He then played professional football in the National Football League (NFL) as a fullback  for the Brooklyn Dodgers in 1930. He appeared in two NFL games.

He died in 1984 in Fort Lee, New Jersey.

References

1907 births
1984 deaths
Rutgers Scarlet Knights football players
Brooklyn Dodgers (NFL) players
Players of American football from New York (state)